Alexander Alexeyevich Voznesensky (March 5, 1898—October 28, 1950) was a Soviet statesman, economist and brother of Nikolai Voznesensky.

Biography 
Born in the village of Golovkino in Novosilsky Uyezd of Tula Governorate (now in Oryol Oblast), he spent his childhood in Chern. His father, Alexey Dmitrievich Voznesensky, worked in a timber yard. His mother, Lyubov Georgievna, was a housewife. He had three younger siblings Maria, Nikolai and Valentine).

In 1917, he enrolled at the Petrograd Institute of History and Philology; in 1921, he joined the Social Sciences Faculty of Petrograd University, graduating in 1923, and soon began to teach.  He joined the All-Union Communist Party (b) in 1927.

His younger brother Nikolai Voznesensky, also an economist, was appointed to the Politburo of the Communist Party of the Soviet Union in February 1941, becoming responsible for much of the planning of the Soviet economy and twice holding the directorship of Gosplan.

Alexander served as the rector of Leningrad State University from 1941 to 1948 and in the spring of 1942 he organized the evacuation of the university to Saratov. In 1947, Voznesensky was elected to the Supreme Soviet of the Soviet Union and in 1948 was appointed Minister of Education of the Russian SFSR.

As his brother fell from favour with Joseph Stalin, in the wake of the Leningrad affair, Alexander was also arrested and tortured in August 1949. 
Although Nikolai Bulganin (Minister for Defense) was friends with Alexander, he could not risk helping him, in case he would also be implicated.

On August 19, 1949, he was arrested on charges of treason, participation in a counterrevolutionary organization, and anti-Soviet agitation (the Leningrad Affair). 
He was convicted and executed in 1950. He was rehabilitated on May 14, 1954.

References

Footnotes

Bibliography

External links 
Handbook on the history of the Communist Party and the Soviet Union 1898 - 1991
List of all Education Ministers of the USSR

1898 births
1950 deaths
People from Oryol Oblast
Communist Party of the Soviet Union members
Russian people executed by the Soviet Union
Soviet economists
Rectors of Saint Petersburg State University
People's commissars and ministers of the Russian Soviet Federative Socialist Republic
Members of the Communist Party of the Soviet Union executed by the Soviet Union